Bo Arne Vibenius (born 29 March 1943) is a Swedish film director, most famous for his exploitation classics Breaking Point and Thriller – A Cruel Picture (Swedish: Thriller – en grym film). The latter served as an influence on Quentin Tarantino when making his Kill Bill films and Tarantino has called it "the roughest revenge movie ever made."

Filmography 
 Hur Marie träffade Fredrik (1969)
 Thriller – A Cruel Picture (1973)
 Breaking Point (1975)

References

External links

1943 births
Living people
People from Solna Municipality
Swedish film directors